Marina Grigorevna Kudriavtseva (née Titova) (born 1 June 1952) is a Soviet figure skating coach and former competitor. She married her coach Viktor Kudriavtsev and has one son named Anton. After her competitive career, she coached skaters Elena Sokolova, Viktoria Volchkova, and Alexander Uspenski among others.

Results

References

External links

 Marina Grigorievna Kudriavtseva (Titova)

Navigation

Soviet female single skaters
Russian figure skating coaches
Figure skaters from Moscow
1952 births
Living people
Female sports coaches